Saïd bin Saïd Tabbara (born in Beirut, Lebanon, died November 27, 2016, in Manama, Bahrain) was a Bahraini-Lebanese educator.

Early life and education
Tabbara was born orphaned when his merchant father died in a Mediterranean Sea storm on return from Acre, Israel, leaving his pregnant wife to raise six children, of which he was named after his father. His siblings were Sobhi, Wadad, Sania, Wafiqah, Hind, and Naamat.

He attended and graduated from the American University of Beirut.

Educational career
Tabbara applied at first to work at Bahrain Petroleum Company (Bapco) but was turned down due to a lack of vacancies, continuing to make an effort to move there by relocating to Basra. Finally, with the help of a recommendation letter from his sister Wafiqah Sawaf-Nairt o the Bahraini emir’s advisor Sir Charles Belgrave, Saïd Tabarra was granted permission to land at the merchant section of Bahrain International Airport (then in the Gudaibiya neighborhood of Manama) in 1940 after taking English classes in Baghdad.

A teacher at the Manama Industrial School in the Department of Machinery from 1940 to 1942, he was promoted to a senior teaching post that he held until 1944, doing most of the work of Principal Geoffrey Edward Hutchings while the latter was away on other duties. Tabbara directed the School from 1944 to 1976, reorienting industrial education in Bahrain toward cooperation with companies such as Bapco. He helped found Jidhafs Secondary Industrial School for Boys in 1969 and was appointed to a series of posts at the Ministry of Education, including director of industrial technical education from 1967 to 1972, director of industrial education from 1972 to 1975, and assistant deputy director for general and technical education from 1975 to 1982. From 1982 to 1984, he served as a consultant for technical higher education. Tabbara participated in many technological and technical education projects in Bahrain, Kuwait, and elsewhere in the Gulf, and he was a member of the Board of Trustees of the University of Bahrain for ten years.

Personal life
Tabbara was married to Aisha Khanum Muhammad Fahmi Yebo and had the children Khalid (born 1950), Jumana, Sajida, and Hoda (1954).

Death
He died on November 27, 2016 in the Bahraini capital of Manama.

Publications
 مهندس التعليم الصناعي في البحرين (“Industrial Engineering Education in Bahrain”) with Hussain Mohammed Al Mahrous

References

Bahraini educators
Lebanese expatriates in Bahrain
Bahraini Sunni Muslims
People from Beirut
2016 deaths